The following is a list of confirmed video games with gay, lesbian, bisexual, or transgender characters, including any others falling under the LGBT umbrella term. The numbers in this list are possibly higher due to fact that some characters remained unconfirmed, unsourced or controversial.

History

During the 1980s, characters that can be argued as identifying as LGBTQ+ were rarely shown in a realistic or non-stereotypical context and were often the objects of ridicule or jokes.

In the 1990s, games (often Japanese ones) continued to use stereotypical LGBT characters which did not reflect the diversity in LGBT communities. However, more efforts were found to make more diverse and less one-dimensional characters.

In 2018, Gamesradar's Sam Greer pored through thousands of gaming titles and found 179 games with any LGBT representation. Of those 179 games, only 83 have queer characters who are playable characters. And of those, only eight feature a main character who is explicitly pre-written as queer as opposed to them being queer as a character creation option.

1980s

1990s

2000s

2010s

2020s

2020

2021

2022

2023 and later

See also

 List of animated works with LGBT characters
 List of graphic art works with LGBT characters
 List of lesbian, gay, bisexual or transgender-related films
 Lists of television programs with LGBT characters
 Lists of American television episodes with LGBT themes

References

Bibliography
 
 

 
 
Video games
LGBT